Lete  Airfield is an abandoned World War II military airfield located in the vicinity of Al Jukhkh al Kabir; about 10 km east of Benghazi.  Its precise location is undetermined, likely redeveloped as part of the suburbs of Benghazi.

It was used by the United States Army Air Force Ninth Air Force during the Eastern Desert Campaign by the British Eighth Army by the 343rd Bombardment Squadron (98th Bombardment Group) from 3 March-25 September 1943, B-24 Liberator and the  344th Bombardment Squadron (98th Bombardment Group), from 4 March-24 September 1943, B-24 Liberator.

References

Further reading
 Maurer, Maurer. Air Force Combat Units of World War II. Maxwell AFB, Alabama: Office of Air Force History, 1983. 521p..

External links

Airfields of the United States Army Air Forces in Libya
World War II airfields in Libya
Airports established in 1943